Current Alzheimer Research is a peer-reviewed medical journal covering the neurobiology, genetics, pathogenesis, and treatment strategies of Alzheimer's disease.

Abstracting and indexing 
The journal is indexed in: 

According to the Journal Citation Reports, the journal has a 2019 impact factor of 3.047, ranking it 65th out of 197 journals in the category "Clinical Neurology".

References

External links 
 

Alzheimer's disease journals
Neuroscience journals
Publications established in 2004
Bentham Science Publishers academic journals
English-language journals
Journals published between 13 and 25 times per year